Guenther House may refer to:

Richard Guenther House in Oshkosh, Wisconsin, National Register of Historic Places Listings 1984
Guenther House (San Antonio, Texas) Museum, restaurant and house, National Register of Historic Places Listings  in Bexar County, Texas 1990

See also
Gunther (disambiguation)